This is a list of 177 species in Triaenodes, a genus of long-horned caddisflies in the family Leptoceridae.

Triaenodes species

 Triaenodes aba Milne, 1935 b
 Triaenodes aberrans (Marlier, 1965) i c g
 Triaenodes abruptus Flint, 1991 i c g
 Triaenodes abus Milne, 1935 i c g
 Triaenodes africanus Ulmer, 1907 i c g
 Triaenodes allax Neboiss & Wells, 1998 i c g
 Triaenodes anomalus Flint, 1967 i c g
 Triaenodes apicatus Navás, 1934 i c g
 Triaenodes apicomaculatus Mey, 1990 i c g
 Triaenodes assimilis (Banks, 1937) i c g
 Triaenodes atalomus Neboiss & Wells, 1998 i c g
 Triaenodes aureus Kimmins, 1962 i c g
 Triaenodes barbarae Neboiss & Wells, 1998 i c g
 Triaenodes baris Ross, 1938 i c g b
 Triaenodes bernardi Vaillant, 1953 i c g
 Triaenodes bernaysae Korboot, 1964 i c g
 Triaenodes bicolor (Curtis, 1834) i c g
 Triaenodes bifasciatus Navás, 1934 i c g
 Triaenodes bifidus Jacquemart, 1966 i c g
 Triaenodes bilobatus Yang & Morse, 2000 i c g
 Triaenodes boettcheri Ulmer, 1930 i c g
 Triaenodes borealis Banks, 1900 i c g
 Triaenodes botosaneanui Marlier, 1978 i c g
 Triaenodes bulupendek Andersen & Holzenthal, 1999 i c g
 Triaenodes calamintella Mey, 1995 i c g
 Triaenodes camurus Neboiss & Wells, 1998 i c g
 Triaenodes celatus Neboiss & Wells, 1998 i c g
 Triaenodes cheliferus (Mosely, 1932) i c g
 Triaenodes clarus Jacquemart, 1961 i c g
 Triaenodes clavatus (Mosely, 1932) i c g
 Triaenodes cloe (Hagen, 1859) i c g
 Triaenodes columbicus Ulmer, 1909 i c g
 Triaenodes conjugatus Neboiss & Wells, 1998 i c g
 Triaenodes connatus Ross, 1959 i c g
 Triaenodes conspersus (Rambur, 1842) g
 Triaenodes contartus Jacquemart & Statzner, 1981 i c g
 Triaenodes copelatus Neboiss & Wells, 1998 i c g
 Triaenodes corallinus Kimmins, 1962 i c g
 Triaenodes corynotrus Neboiss & Wells, 1998 i c g
 Triaenodes costalis Kimmins, 1962 i c g
 Triaenodes cumberlandensis Etnier & Way, 1973 i c g
 Triaenodes cuspiosus Neboiss & Wells, 1998 i c g
 Triaenodes cymulosus Neboiss & Wells, 1998 i c g
 Triaenodes darfuricus Mosely, 1936 i c g
 Triaenodes delicatus Navas, 1924 i c g
 Triaenodes demoulini Jacquemart, 1967 i c g
 Triaenodes dentatus Banks, 1914 i c g
 Triaenodes dibolia Neboiss & Wells, 1998 i c g
 Triaenodes difformis Mosely, 1932 i c g
 Triaenodes dipsia  b
 Triaenodes dipsius Ross, 1938 i c g
 Triaenodes dolabratus Gibbs, 1973 i c g
 Triaenodes doryphorus Neboiss & Wells, 1998 i c g
 Triaenodes drepana Neboiss & Wells, 1998 i c g
 Triaenodes dubius Mosely, 1934 i c g
 Triaenodes dusrus Schmid, 1965 i c g
 Triaenodes dysmica Neboiss & Wells, 1998 i c g
 Triaenodes elegantulus Ulmer, 1908 i c g
 Triaenodes empheirus Neboiss & Wells, 1998 i c g
 Triaenodes esakii Tsuda, 1941 i c g
 Triaenodes etheira Neboiss & Wells, 1998 i c g
 Triaenodes excisus Kimmins, 1957 i c g
 Triaenodes eximius Schmid, 1994 i c g
 Triaenodes falculatus Kimmins, 1956 i c g
 Triaenodes fantasio Schmid, 1994 i c g
 Triaenodes fijianus Mosely, 1941 i c g
 Triaenodes flavescens Banks, 1900 i c g b
 Triaenodes florida Ross, 1941 i c g
 Triaenodes foliformis Yang & Morse, 2000 i c g
 Triaenodes forficatus Neboiss & Wells, 1998 i c g
 Triaenodes fortunio Schmid, 1994 i c g
 Triaenodes fulvus Navás, 1931 i c g
 Triaenodes furcellus Ross, 1959 i c g
 Triaenodes fuscinulus Neboiss & Wells, 1998 i c g
 Triaenodes gazella (Hagen, 1859) i c g
 Triaenodes ghana Kimmins, 1957 i c g
 Triaenodes gibberosus Neboiss & Wells, 1998 i c g
 Triaenodes hastatus Ulmer, 1908 i c g
 Triaenodes hauseri Mey, 1998 i c g
 Triaenodes helo Milne, 1934 i c g
 Triaenodes hickini Kimmins, 1957 i c g
 Triaenodes hirsutus Jacquemart, 1966 i c g
 Triaenodes hoenei Schmid, 1959 i c g
 Triaenodes hybos Mey, 1998 i c g
 Triaenodes ignitus (Walker, 1852) i c g
 Triaenodes imakus Gibbs, 1973 i c g
 Triaenodes implexus Neboiss & Wells, 1998 i c g
 Triaenodes indicus Martynov, 1936 i c g
 Triaenodes inflexus Morse, 1971 i c g
 Triaenodes injusta Hagen, 1861 b
 Triaenodes injustus (Hagen, 1861) i c g
 Triaenodes insulanus Ulmer, 1951 i c g
 Triaenodes insularis Navás, 1936 i c g
 Triaenodes intricata Neboiss, 1977 i c g
 Triaenodes jubatus Neboiss, 1982 i c g
 Triaenodes kimilus Mosely, 1939 i c g
 Triaenodes laamii Dakki, 1980 i c g
 Triaenodes laciniatus Neboiss & Wells, 1998 i c g
 Triaenodes lanceolatus Kimmins, 1957 i c g
 Triaenodes lankarama Schmid, 1958 i c g
 Triaenodes legonus Mosely, 1939 i c g
 Triaenodes longispinus Kimmins, 1962 i c g
 Triaenodes loriai Navás, 1932 i c g
 Triaenodes lurideolus Mey, 1990 i c g
 Triaenodes manni Banks, 1936 i c g
 Triaenodes marginata Milne, 1934 b
 Triaenodes marginatus Sibley, 1926 i c g
 Triaenodes mataranka Neboiss & Wells, 1998 i c g
 Triaenodes melacus Ross, 1947 i c g
 Triaenodes melanopeza Neboiss & Wells, 1998 i c g
 Triaenodes mondoanus Kimmins, 1962 i c g
 Triaenodes moselyi Kimmins, 1962 i c g
 Triaenodes mouldsi Neboiss & Wells, 1998 i c g
 Triaenodes nesiotinus Neboiss & Wells, 1998 i c g
 Triaenodes nigrolineatus Kimmins, 1962 i c g
 Triaenodes niwai Iwata, 1927 i c g
 Triaenodes notalius Neboiss & Wells, 1998 i c g
 Triaenodes nox Ross, 1941 i c g
 Triaenodes nymphaea Neboiss & Wells, 1998 i c g
 Triaenodes ochraceus (Betten & Mosely, 1940) i c g
 Triaenodes ochreellus McLachlan, 1877 i c g
 Triaenodes ornatus Ulmer, 1915 i c g
 Triaenodes palpalis Banks, 1920 i c g
 Triaenodes pellectus Ulmer, 1908 i c g
 Triaenodes perissotes Neboiss & Wells, 1998 i c g
 Triaenodes perna Ross, 1938 i c g
 Triaenodes peruanus Flint & Reyes-Arrunategui, 1991 i c g
 Triaenodes phalacris Ross, 1938 i c g
 Triaenodes piceus Kimmins, 1957 i c g
 Triaenodes plutonis (Banks, 1931) i c g
 Triaenodes polystachius (Marlier, 1957) i c g
 Triaenodes probolius Neboiss & Wells, 1998 i c g
 Triaenodes prosynskii (Marlier & Botosaneanu, 1968) i c g
 Triaenodes qinglingensis Yang & Morse, 2000 i c g
 Triaenodes reclusus Neboiss & Wells, 1998 i c g
 Triaenodes resimus Neboiss & Wells, 1998 i c g
 Triaenodes reuteri (McLachlan, 1880) b
 Triaenodes rufescens Martynov, 1935 i c g
 Triaenodes rutellus Neboiss & Wells, 1998 i c g
 Triaenodes scottae Gibon, 1982 i c g
 Triaenodes semigraphatus Mey, 1990 i c g
 Triaenodes sericeus Navás, 1935 i c g
 Triaenodes serratus Ulmer, 1912 i c g
 Triaenodes siculus (Barnard, 1934) i c g
 Triaenodes sinicus Ulmer, 1932 i c g
 Triaenodes smithi Ross, 1959 i c g
 Triaenodes spoliatus Mey, 1998 i c g
 Triaenodes stipulosus Neboiss & Wells, 1998 i c g
 Triaenodes taenius Ross, 1938 i c g
 Triaenodes tafanus Kimmins, 1962 i c g
 Triaenodes tanzanicus Olah, 1986 i c g
 Triaenodes tardus Milne, 1934 i c g b
 Triaenodes telefominicus Kumanski, 1979 i c g
 Triaenodes teneratus Neboiss & Wells, 1998 i c g
 Triaenodes teresis Neboiss & Wells, 1998 i c g
 Triaenodes theiophorus Neboiss & Wells, 1998 i c g
 Triaenodes tofanus Gibbs, 1973 i c g
 Triaenodes torresianus Neboiss & Wells, 1998 i c g
 Triaenodes toxeres Neboiss & Wells, 1998 i c g
 Triaenodes transversarius Mey, 1990 i c g
 Triaenodes triaenodiformis (Ulmer, 1930) i c g
 Triaenodes tridontus Ross, 1938 i c g
 Triaenodes trifidus Kimmins, 1957 i c g
 Triaenodes triquetrus Neboiss & Wells, 1998 i c g
 Triaenodes trivulcio Schmid, 1994 i c g
 Triaenodes troubati Gibon, 1982 i c g
 Triaenodes unanimis McLachlan, 1877 i c g
 Triaenodes uncatus Kimmins, 1962 i c g
 Triaenodes ustulatus Kimmins, 1962 i c g
 Triaenodes uvidus Neboiss & Wells, 1998 i c g
 Triaenodes verberatus Neboiss & Wells, 1998 i c g
 Triaenodes vespertinus Neboiss & Wells, 1998 i c g
 Triaenodes virgulus Neboiss & Wells, 1998 i c g
 Triaenodes voldus Mosely in Mosely & Kimmins, 1953 i c g
 Triaenodes vorhiesi Betten, 1934 i c g
 Triaenodes wambanus Mosely, 1939 i c g
 Triaenodes wannonensis Neboiss & Wells, 1998 i c g

Data sources: i = ITIS, c = Catalogue of Life, g = GBIF, b = Bugguide.net

References

Triaenodes